The 2007 NCAA Division I baseball season, play of college baseball in the United States organized by the National Collegiate Athletic Association (NCAA) at the Division I level, began on January 25, 2007.  The season progressed through the regular season, many conference tournaments and championship series, and concluded with the 2007 NCAA Division I baseball tournament and 2007 College World Series.  The College World Series, which consisted of the eight remaining teams in the NCAA tournament, was held in its annual location of Omaha, Nebraska, at Rosenblatt Stadium.  It concluded on June 24, 2007, with the final game of the best of three championship series.  Oregon State defeated North Carolina two games to none to claim their second consecutive championship, which was also their second overall.

Realignment

New programs
Two programs, Central Arkansas and NJIT, moved from Division II to Division I for the 2007 season.

Dropped programs
Birmingham–Southern, which had competed in the Big South Conference, dropped to the Division III Southern Collegiate Athletic Conference for the 2007 season.  St. Francis (NY) dropped its varsity intercollegiate baseball program following the 2006 season.

Conference changes

The Sun Belt Conference added two members, Florida Atlantic from the Atlantic Sun Conference and Louisiana–Monroe from the Southland Conference.

The Southland added two members, Texas A&M–Corpus Christi (formerly a Division I independent) and Central Arkansas (formerly of Division II).

Two schools became Division I independents– Chicago State, which moved from the Mid-Continent Conference, and NJIT, which moved from Division II.

Conference formats
The Southland Conference, whose membership changes left it with 12 baseball-sponsoring members, split into two six-team divisions.

Conference standings

College World Series

The 2007 season marked the sixty first NCAA Baseball Tournament, which culminated with the eight team College World Series.  The College World Series was held in Omaha, Nebraska.  The eight teams played a double-elimination format, with Oregon State claiming their first championship with a two games to none series win over North Carolina in the final.

Bracket

Award winners

All-America team

References 

2007 Division I Standings at BoydsWorld.com